Nominal power is a power capacity in engineering.

Radio broadcasting

Nominal power is a measurement of a mediumwave radio station's output used in the United States.

Photovoltaic devices

Nominal power is the nameplate capacity of photovoltaic (PV) devices, such as solar cells, panels and systems, and is determined by measuring  the electric current and voltage in a circuit, while varying the resistance under precisely defined conditions.

See also

 Power rating
 Real versus nominal value

References

Electrical engineering